Olceclostera is a genus of moths of the family Apatelodidae.

Species
According to Kitching et al. 2018, the genus includes the following species:

 Olceclostera amelda Dyar, 1915
 Olceclostera amoria Druce, 1890
 Olceclostera angelica (Grote, 1864)
 Olceclostera avangareza Schaus, 1910
 Olceclostera azteca Schaus, 1894
 Olceclostera basifusca Draudt, 1929
 Olceclostera bifenestrata Schaus, 1912
 Olceclostera bilinea Schaus, 1900
 Olceclostera brama Schaus, 1920
 Olceclostera castra E. D. Jones, 1908
 Olceclostera castrona Schaus, 1894
 Olceclostera cuyabata Draudt, 1929
 Olceclostera guanduna Draudt, 1929
 Olceclostera ibar (Schaus, 1927)
 Olceclostera indentata Schaus, 1910
 Olceclostera indistincta (H. Edwards, 1886)
 Olceclostera interniplaga Draudt, 1929
 Olceclostera irrorata (Butler, 1878)
 Olceclostera magniplaga Schaus, 1910
 Olceclostera maya Schaus, 1892
 Olceclostera microps (Walker, 1855)
 Olceclostera mutusca Schaus, 1892
 Olceclostera nigripuncta Schaus, 1910
 Olceclostera oriunda Schaus, 1905
 Olceclostera porioni Herbin & Mielke, 2018
 Olceclostera reperta (Walker, 1865)
 Olceclostera seraphica (Dyar, 1906)
 Olceclostera truncata (Walker, 1855)

References

 

Apatelodidae
Moth genera